Kertomesis is a moth genus in the family Autostichidae.

Species
 Kertomesis acatharta (Meyrick, 1911)
 Kertomesis amblycryptis (Meyrick, 1929)
 Kertomesis amphicalyx (Meyrick, 1911)
 Kertomesis anaphracta (Meyrick, 1907)
 Kertomesis anthracosema (Meyrick, 1933)
 Kertomesis corymbitis (Meyrick, 1926)
 Kertomesis dolabrata (Meyrick, 1916)
 Kertomesis indagata (Meyrick, 1918)
 Kertomesis oxycryptis (Meyrick, 1929)
 Kertomesis palacta (Meyrick, 1911)
 Kertomesis rhodota (Meyrick, 1911)
 Kertomesis stesichora (Meyrick, 1911)
 Kertomesis thyrota (Meyrick, 1929)

References

 
Symmocinae